The Fire Raisers may refer to

 The Fire Raisers (film), a 1934 British film starring Leslie Banks
 The Fire Raisers (play), aka The Firebugs, a 1953 German play